Class 805 may refer to:

British Rail Class 805
ICE 2